ViiV Healthcare is a pharmaceutical company specializing in the development of therapies for HIV infection that was created as a joint venture by Pfizer and GlaxoSmithKline in November 2009 with both companies transferring their HIV assets to the new company. In 2012 Shionogi joined the company. 76.5% of the company is now owned by GlaxoSmithKline, 13.5% by Pfizer and 10% by Shionogi. This ownership structure may change depending upon the achievement of certain milestones.

ViiV Healthcare's products have a market share of approximately 19% of the global HIV market, making it the second-largest healthcare company, after Gilead Sciences, which is working on the treatment of HIV.

ViiV Healthcare's headquarters are in Brentford in the United Kingdom and it has sites in a number of other countries including; the United States, Australia, Belgium, Canada, France, Germany, Italy, Japan, Mexico, the Netherlands, Portugal, Puerto Rico, Russia, Spain and Switzerland.

Products
The company currently markets 17 products:

 Nucleoside reverse transcriptase inhibitors (NRTIs):
 abacavir (brand name Ziagen)
 lamivudine (brand names Epivir and 3TC)
 zidovudine (brand name Retrovir and AZT)
 Non-nucleoside reverse transcriptase inhibitors (NNRTIs):
 delavirdine (brand name Rescriptor, no longer available)
 Attachment inhibitors
 fostemsavir (brand name Rukobia)
 Integrase strand transfer inhibitors (INSTIs):
 dolutegravir (brand name Tivicay)
 cabotegravir (brand names Apretude and Vocabria)
 Protease inhibitors:
 fosamprenavir (brand names Lexiva and Telzir)
 nelfinavir (brand name Viracept)
 Entry inhibitors:
 maraviroc (brand names Selzentry and Celsentri)
 Antiretroviral fixed-dose combinations, including several single-pill regimens:
 abacavir/lamivudine (brand names Epzicom and Kivexa)
 abacavir/lamivudine/zidovudine (brand name Trizivir)
 lamivudine/zidovudine (brand name Combivir)
 abacavir/dolutegravir/lamivudine (brand name Triumeq)
 dolutegravir/lamivudine (brand name Dovato)
 dolutegravir/rilpivirine (brand name Juluca - in partnership with Janssen Pharmaceutica)
 cabotegravir/rilpivirine (brand name Cabenuva)

Treatment access programs 
ViiV Healthcare has stated that it will continue the not-for-profit pricing schemes that Pfizer and GlaxoSmithKline had been involved in prior to the setting up of the company. This program covers all low and middle income countries, as well as all of Sub-Saharan Africa.

The company has also granted voluntary licenses to 14 generics companies to enable the low-cost manufacture and sale of generic versions of the company's products in specific countries and/or regions.

In March 2020, ViiV Healthcare announced the initiation of a study in partnership with University of South Carolina's Ryan White Program to determine the effectiveness of ride-sharing services in improving access to care for people living with HIV.

See also
 Pharmaceutical industry in the United Kingdom

References

Pharmaceutical companies established in 2009
GSK plc
Joint ventures
Pharmaceutical companies of the United Kingdom
Pfizer